The Kiev Theological Academy (1819—1919) was one of the oldest higher educational institution of the Russian Orthodox Church, situated in Kyiv, then in the Russian Empire (now Kyiv, Ukraine). It was considered as the most senior one among similar academies in Moscow, Saint Petersburg, and Kazan. It was located at the Kyiv Podol within the Kyiv Epiphany Monastery. In the Russian historiography, the Academy′s predecessor was the Academia Mohileana that was founded earlier in the 17th century.

History

Predecessor Collegium Mohileanum in Kyiv 
The Kiev Theological Academy traces its history back to 1615, when Yelisey Pletenetsky founded a school at the Brotherhood Monastery in Kyiv. Several decades later, Peter Mohyla, from 1632 an Orthodox Metropolitan of Kiev under the Patriarchate of Constantinople, merged it with a newly established Lavra school into the Mohyla Collegium (Latin: Collegium Kijovense Mohileanum). The Collegium alumni include Innokentiy Gizel, Lazar Baranovych, Dmitry Tuptalo, Stephen Yavorsky, Feofan Prokopovich and many other state activists and Orthodox clerics who helped reform the Russian Orthodox Church under the auspices of Patriarch Nikon and Peter the Great. In 1658 under the terms of the Treaty of Hadiach the Collegium obtained the status of an Academy, similar to Kraków Academy. This was recognized in 1694 by the Russian tsar Ivan V, then reaffirmed by Peter I in 1701, when it became the Mohyla Academy.

Establishment of the Theological Academy
The Mohyla Academy was closed in 1817 by the decree of Alexander I of Russia. In 1819, the Kiev Theological Academy, an ecclesiastical educational institution, was opened in the Brotherhood Monastery. In contrast to its predecessor, the Mohyla Academy, like all similar establishments in Russia at the time the Kiev Theological Academy admitted sons of clergy only. The Kiev Theological Academy continued under this name until its closure by the Soviets in 1919. Some unofficial courses were held even at a later period. An attempt to open the Kiev Orthodox Theological Academy within the walls of the Kiev Pechersk Lavra was made after the Second World War in 1947. The academy was revived in 1992 and is based on the grounds of the Kiev Pechersk Lavra. (The main cathedral of the Brotherhood Monastery was destroyed in 1935 by the Soviet authorities).

Upon the closure of the Kiev Theological Academy, its quarters were passed to the Soviet's Red Army Dnieper Flotilla staff headquarters. 

After the Second World War the Kiev Theological Seminary was opened in 1947. It situated in the Kyiv Golden-Domed Monastery (1947 - 1949) and in the stylobate of St Andrew's Church in Kyiv (1949 - 1960).

Current successors 
Since the 1990s, there are three educational establishments in Ukraine that claim to be successors to the Kyiv-Mohyla Academy. The Ukrainian Orthodox Church operates the Kiev Theological Academy in the Kiev Pechersk Lavra. The National University of Kyiv-Mohyla Academy is a secular educational institution in Ukraine.

References

Sourses 

 Mitrophan Bozhko. The Kyiv Theological Seminary in 1947–1960: A Brief Introduction to Further Study // Теолошки погледи. — Т. LIII. — №3. — Београд: Свети Архиереjски Синод Српске Православне Цркве, 2020. — С.723–742. 
Митрофан (Божко), ієром. Спроба відкриття Київської православної духовної академії в стінах Києво-Печерської Лаври у 1947 р. // Могилянські читання 2021. Вивчення та збереження культурного надбання: до 95-річчя заснування Національного заповідник «Києво-Печерська лавра». Зб. наук. праць. — К.: Національний заповідник «Києво-Печерська лавра», Видавництво «Фенікс», 2021. — С.60–66 [in Ukrainian].  
Митрофан (Божко), ієром. Київська духовна семінарія 1946–1947 рр.: обставини відкриття та перший навчальний рік // Труди Київської Духовної Академії. — №33. — К.: Київська духовна академія і семінарія, 2020. — С.186–196 [in Ukrainian].

External links 
 Website of Kyivan Theological Academy of the Moscow Patriarchate
 Website of Kyivan Orthodox Theological Academy of the Kyivan Patriarchate

Eastern Orthodox schools
Eastern Orthodox seminaries
Universities and colleges affiliated with the Russian Orthodox Church
Universities and colleges in the Polish–Lithuanian Commonwealth
Education in the Russian Empire
1615 establishments in the Polish–Lithuanian Commonwealth
Educational institutions established in the 1610s
1615 establishments in Ukraine
Educational institutions established in 1819
1819 establishments in the Russian Empire
1819 establishments in Ukraine
Educational institutions disestablished in 1919
1919 disestablishments in Ukraine
1919 disestablishments in Russia